Thomas Alun Lockyer (born 3 December 1994) is a Welsh professional footballer who plays as a centre-back for  club Luton Town and the Wales national team.

Club career

Bristol Rovers

Lockyer was born and raised in Cardiff. He joined Cardiff City as a youth aged 11, but was released aged 16, as Cardiff deemed him to be too small to play his preferred position of centre-back. Lockyer then signed a scholarship for Bristol Rovers in 2011 and went on to make his debut on 12 January 2013, replacing Ellis Harrison, 85 minutes into a 3–0 win over Fleetwood Town at Highbury Stadium. He made his home debut two months later on 12 March 2013, replacing Oliver Norburn in the 74th minute in a 2–0 win over Port Vale. He signed his first professional contract in May 2013, after making his previous appearances whilst still a youth team player.

Lockyer scored his first league goal in a 1–0 win for Bristol Rovers over Northampton Town on 31 August 2013.

On 17 March 2014, Lockyer signed a new two-year contract extension with Rovers. After Rovers were relegated out of League Two in the 2013–14 season, Lockyer became a very important part of a very successful season after seeing the club get promoted first time of asking. In that season he managed to score one goal vs Grimsby Town. As Rovers returned to League Two, he was a first-team regular and was rewarded by being named the Football League Young Player of the Month for December 2015 after consistent good performances.

He made his 200th appearance for Rovers on 19 August 2017, in a 3–2 victory over Bury, in which he scored the opener.

He departed Bristol Rovers following the expiration of his contract at the end of the 2018–19 season.

Charlton Athletic
Lockyer joined Charlton Athletic, who were newly promoted to the Championship, on 28 June 2019 on a two-year contract. His first and only goal for the club was the equaliser in a 2–2 home draw with West Bromwich Albion on 11 January 2020. After playing every minute of 43 league appearances in the 2019–20 season and missing only three matches due to suspension, Lockyer triggered a relegation release clause in his contract in August 2020, allowing him to join another club for free.

Luton Town
Lockyer signed for another Championship club, Luton Town, on 1 September 2020 on a free transfer. His debut came two weeks later in a 1–0 EFL Cup second round victory over Reading. In January 2022, Lockyer scored his first goal for the club with his side's first in a 2–1 win over Bristol City, saying after the match that he had dreamed of scoring against his old rivals.

International career
In October 2015, Lockyer made his Wales under-21 debut in a 0–0 draw against Denmark.

Lockyer was called up to the Welsh senior team in June 2017, remaining an unused substitute during a 1–1 draw with Serbia. He received his second call-up for the senior squad on 25 August 2017, for the upcoming qualifiers against Austria and Moldova. He made his debut for the senior team on 14 November 2017 as a half-time substitute during a 1–1 draw with Panama. In May 2021 he was selected for the Wales squad for the delayed UEFA Euro 2020 tournament.

On 9 November 2022, more than a year since he last played for his country, Lockyer was called up to the Wales squad for the upcoming 2022 FIFA World Cup.

Career statistics

Club

International

Honours
Bristol Rovers
Conference Premier play-offs: 2015
Football League Two third-place promotion: 2015–16

Individual
Football League Young Player of the Month: December 2015

References

External links

 Profile at the Luton Town F.C. website

1994 births
Living people
Footballers from Cardiff
Welsh footballers
Wales under-21 international footballers
Wales international footballers
Association football defenders
Cardiff City F.C. players
Bristol Rovers F.C. players
Charlton Athletic F.C. players
Luton Town F.C. players
English Football League players
National League (English football) players
UEFA Euro 2020 players
2022 FIFA World Cup players